Miroslava Kijaková (born 5 May 1988) is a Slovak female volleyball player. She is part of the Slovakia women's national volleyball team. She competed at the 2019 Women's European Volleyball Championship.

Clubs
  VK Vranov nad Topľou (2003–2006)
  TU Košice (2006–2008)
  VK Spišská Nová Ves (2008–2010)
  Ostrowiec Świętokrzyski (2010–2011)
  Radom, Politechnika (2011-2012)
  AGH Galeco Wisła Kraków (2012–2013)
  CSM Volei Alba Blaj (2013–2014)
  VC Kanti Schaffhausen (2014–2015)
  AO Thiras (2015–2016)
  Trentino Rosa (2016–2017)
  Due Principati Baronissi (2017–2018)
  CV Haris (2018–2018)
  Anorthosis Famagusta (2018–2019)
  Hapoel Kfar Saba (2019–2020)
  CMFC, Chinese (2020-2021)

References

External links 

 Profile on CEV

1988 births
Living people
Slovak women's volleyball players
Slovak expatriate sportspeople in Poland
Slovak expatriate sportspeople in Romania
Slovak expatriate sportspeople in Switzerland
Slovak expatriate sportspeople in Greece
Slovak expatriate sportspeople in Italy
Slovak expatriate sportspeople in Spain
Slovak expatriate sportspeople in Cyprus
Slovak expatriate sportspeople in Israel
People from Bardejov
Sportspeople from the Prešov Region